Pioneertown Mountains Preserve is a Wildlands Conservancy nature preserve consisting of  of land in San Bernardino County, California.
It features geologically interesting mountain ranges and riparian zones.  It is located in the Mojave Desert in the eastern San Bernardino Mountains.

Recreation
The preserve has hiking trails, picnic area, and restroom.
Indian Loop Trail passes through a wetlands from a perennial stream and climbs to a ridge with views of rocky peaks.  It passes by the Olsen Cabin ruins.
A spur trail ascends Chaparrosa Peak which provides views in all directions.
The peak is on the Hundred Peaks Section list.
Sawtooth Loop encircles the Sawtooth Mountains which have massive jumbles of boulders.

Geography
It is notable for its rock formations, desert-riparian corridor, and diverse ecology.
Pipes Canyon and Little Morongo Canyon are year-round riparian corridors.

The Conservancy has three desert preserves in this region: Whitewater Preserve, Mission Creek Preserve, and Pioneertown Mountains Preserve.

Flora and fauna
Scrub oak is growing in place of the vegetation burned in 2006.

History
In the 1930s a stone cabin was built in Pipes Canyon by a miner.  Ruins of this cabin remain.

In 1995, property was acquired and opened to the public.  This was the first Wildlands Conservancy preserve.

In 2006, the Sawtooth Complex Fire severely burned most vegetation in the preserve.  The area has begun recovering.

In 2017, a severe flash flood caused extensive damage in Pipes Canyon.  The upper part of Pipes Canyon Trail beyond the Olsen Ruins was destroyed and has not been reopened.  Debris flows covered the road into the preserve 3-5 feet deep.

References

External links

Bibliography
 

Nature reserves in California
Protected areas of San Bernardino County, California